Robănești is a commune in Dolj County, Oltenia, Romania, with a population of 2,821 people. It is composed of six villages: Bojoiu, Golfin, Lăcrița Mare, Lăcrița Mică, Robăneștii de Jos (the commune center) and Robăneștii de Sus.

See also
Battle of Robănești

References

Communes in Dolj County
Localities in Oltenia